Marion Arnott is a Scottish mystery, science fiction and fantasy writer. Arnott also works as an English and history secondary school teacher at St Andrew's Academy in Paisley, Renfrewshire.

She won the Crime Writers' Association Short Dagger Award in 2001 with Prussian Snowdrops which focuses on a journalist who is sent to a remote part of Germany by the Nazis after making fun of the regime. She was also shortlisted for the award in 2002 for her short story Marbles, and in 2003 for Dollface.

Her fantasy short story, The Little Drummer Boy, was nominated for the 2007 British Fantasy Award for best short fiction. The story focuses on Francis, a boy who is routinely beaten by his father, who discovers he can leave his own body at will and enter other people's.

References

External links
 Personal Website

British science fiction writers
Scottish fantasy writers
Scottish science fiction writers
Scottish women writers
Women science fiction and fantasy writers
Scottish women novelists
People associated with Renfrewshire
21st-century Scottish women writers
Scottish schoolteachers